Nagan Raya Regency is a regency  in the Aceh special region of Indonesia. It is located on the island of Sumatra. The seat of the regency government is at Suka Makmue. The regency covers an area of 3,544.90 square kilometres and had a population of 139,663 people according to the 2010 Census and 168,392 at the 2020 Census. The official estimate as at mid 2021 was 170,591.

Administrative districts 
As at 2010, the regency was divided administratively into eight districts (kecamatan); however in 2011 two additional districts were created - Tripa Makmur (by division from Darul Makmur District) and Beutong Ateuh Banggalang (by division from Beutong District). Their areas (in km2) and their populations at the 2010 Census and 2020 Census, together with the official estimates as at mid 2021, are listed below. The table also includes the locations of the district administrative centres, the number of villages (rural desa and urban kelurahan) in each district, and its postal codes.

Notes: (a) included in 2010 figure for Darul Makmur District. (b) included in 2010 figure for Beutong District.

Paddy fields
In 2012, Nagan Raya Regency has 24,698 hectares paddy fields with production of 164,586 tonnes of rice equivalent per year. Only a third of production is for regency's consumption and the rest is about 110,000 tonnes sold to other regencies and even to Medan, North Sumatra Province.

See also 

 List of regencies and cities of Indonesia

References

External links 
 Environmental Office website

Regencies of Aceh